Magnetic hysteresis occurs when an external magnetic field is applied to a ferromagnet such as iron and the atomic dipoles align themselves with it. Even when the field is removed, part of the alignment will be retained: the material has become magnetized. Once magnetized, the magnet will stay magnetized indefinitely. To demagnetize it requires heat or a magnetic field in the opposite direction. This is the effect that provides the element of memory in a hard disk drive.

The relationship between field strength  and magnetization   is not linear in such materials. This curve increases rapidly at first and then approaches an asymptote called magnetic saturation. If the magnetic field is now reduced monotonically,  follows a different curve. At zero field strength, the magnetization is offset from the origin by an amount called the remanence. If the  relationship is plotted for all strengths of applied magnetic field the result is a hysteresis loop called the main loop. The width of the middle section along the H axis is twice the coercivity of the material.

A closer look at a magnetization curve generally reveals a series of small, random jumps in magnetization called Barkhausen jumps. This effect is due to crystallographic defects such as dislocations.

Magnetic hysteresis loops are not exclusive to materials with ferromagnetic ordering. Other magnetic orderings, such as spin glass ordering, also exhibit this phenomenon.

Physical origin

The phenomenon of hysteresis in ferromagnetic materials is the result of two effects: rotation of magnetization and changes in size or number of magnetic domains. In general, the magnetization varies (in direction but not magnitude) across a magnet, but in sufficiently small magnets, it doesn't. In these single-domain magnets, the magnetization responds to a magnetic field by rotating. Single-domain magnets are used wherever a strong, stable magnetization is needed (for example, magnetic recording).

Larger magnets are divided into regions called domains. Within each domain, the magnetization does not vary; but between domains are relatively thin domain walls in which the direction of magnetization rotates from the direction of one domain to another. If the magnetic field changes, the walls move, changing the relative sizes of the domains. Because the domains are not magnetized in the same direction, the magnetic moment per unit volume is smaller than it would be in a single-domain magnet; but domain walls involve rotation of only a small part of the magnetization, so it is much easier to change the magnetic moment. The magnetization can also change by addition or subtraction of domains (called nucleation and denucleation).

Measurement

Magnetic hysteresis can be characterized in various ways. In general, the magnetic material is placed in a varying applied  field, as induced by an electromagnet, and the resulting magnetic flux density ( field) is measured, generally by the inductive electromotive force introduced on a pickup coil nearby the sample.

These two curves are directly related since .

The measurement may be closed-circuit or open-circuit, according to how the magnetic material is placed in a magnetic circuit.

 In open-circuit measurement techniques (such as a vibrating-sample magnetometer), the sample is suspended in free space between two poles of an electromagnet. Because of this, a demagnetizing field develops and the  field internal to the magnetic material is different than the applied . The normal B-H curve can be obtained after the demagnetizing effect is corrected.
 In closed-circuit measurements (such as the hysteresisgraph), the flat faces of the sample are pressed directly against the poles of the electromagnet. Since the pole faces are highly permeable, this removes the demagnetizing field, and so the internal  field is equal to the applied  field.

With hard magnetic materials (such as sintered neodymium magnets), the detailed microscopic process of magnetization reversal depends on whether the magnet is in an open-circuit or closed-circuit configuration, since the magnetic medium around the magnet influences the interactions between domains in a way that cannot be fully captured by a simple demagnetization factor.

Models
The most known empirical models in hysteresis are Preisach and Jiles-Atherton models. These models allow an accurate modeling of the hysteresis loop and are widely used in the industry.

However, these models lose the connection with thermodynamics and the energy consistency is not ensured. A more recent model, with a more consistent thermodynamic foundation, is the vectorial incremental nonconservative consistent hysteresis (VINCH) model of Lavet et al. (2011). is inspired by the kinematic hardening laws and by the thermodynamics of irreversible processes.  In particular, in addition to provide an accurate modeling, the stored magnetic energy and the dissipated energy are known at all times. The obtained incremental formulation is variationally consistent, i.e., all internal variables follow from the minimization of a thermodynamic potential. That allows easily obtaining a vectorial model while Preisach and Jiles-Atherton are fundamentally scalar models.

The Stoner–Wohlfarth model is a physical model explaining hysteresis in terms of anisotropic response ("easy" / "hard" axes of each crystalline grain).

Micromagnetics simulations attempt to capture and explain in detail the space and time aspects of interacting magnetic domains, often based on the Landau-Lifshitz-Gilbert equation.

Toy models such as the Ising model can help explain qualitative and thermodynamic aspects of hysteresis (such as the Curie point phase transition to paramagnetic behaviour), though they are not used to describe real magnets.

Applications

There are a great variety in applications of the theory of hysteresis in magnetic materials. Many of these make use of their ability to retain a memory, for example magnetic tape, hard disks, and credit cards. In these applications, hard magnets (high coercivity) like iron are desirable so the memory is not easily erased.

Soft magnets (low coercivity) are used as cores in transformers and electromagnets. The response of the magnetic moment to a magnetic field boosts the response of the coil wrapped around it. Low coercivity reduces that energy loss associated with hysteresis.

Magnetic hysteresis material (soft nickel-iron rods) has been used in damping the angular motion of satellites in low earth orbit since the dawn of the space age.

See also 
 Degaussing

References 

Magnetostatics
Magnetic hysteresis
Electromagnetism
Physical quantities